Monti Carlo (born May 7, 1975) is a Puerto Rican Food TV Host and Special Events Chef. She blogs at islandgirlcooks.com. Monti hosts Food Network's Help My Yelp, a joint production between ITV and Yelp. She's also hosted the special Make My Food Famous for A&E's FYI Network and Nutritious Bites for PBS. She is a judge and contributor for multiple Food Network shows including Cutthroat Kitchen, SuperMarket Stakeout, and The Next Food Network Star. The James Beard Foundation Advisor was highlighted by The Spruce Eats as one of 2021's Culinarian's You Should Know. She  placed fifth on Gordon Ramsay's third season of MasterChef U.S.

Early life and family
Monti was born in Río Piedras, Puerto Rico in 1975 but left the island for the mainland U.S. at six years old, returning periodically until 1993 when she permanently moved to the mainland. She has a twin brother. She lives in Hollywood, California with her child, Danger.

Filmography

Television

References

1975 births
Living people
Puerto Rican chefs
Puerto Rican bloggers
Puerto Rican television hosts
People from Río Piedras, Puerto Rico